Route 238, also known as Elliston Road, is a  north-south highway on the northeastern corner of the Bonavista Peninsula on the island of Newfoundland. It is one of very few highways in Newfoundland and Labrador that both begin and end at the same highway, this one being Route 230 (Bonavista Peninsula Highway).

Route description

Route 238 begins at an intersection with Route 230 southwest of Elliston in a very rural and remote area. Route 238 heads northeast to wind its way through Elliston, where it has an intersection with a local spur road, labeled as Route 238-11, which provides access to other areas of town and Maberly. The highway now winds its way northwest through rural terrain for several kilometres to enter Bonavista, where it has an intersection with Spillars Cove Road, which provides access to Spillars Cove. Route 238 now heads west along Coster Street past a cemetery and a neighbourhood before coming to an end at another intersection with Route 230 (Confederation Drive).

Major intersections

The Elliston Road 
The portion that outsiders would call the Elliston Road itself has three distinct parts called by Elliston dwellers the Bonavista Road, the Catalina Road and the Maberly Road.

The portion between Elliston and Bonavista (ending near Spillar's Cove) is called by those of Elliston 'The Bonavista Road.' It forms a T-junction with the two other parts of Route 238 mentioned here. Coming from Bonavista, if you turn right at the stop-sign (just past the Anglican graveyard on the right), you leave Elliston again quite quickly on the Catalina Road which, although it does not go directly to Catalina, does bring you to Route 230 on the outskirts of Bonavista towards Catalina. If, having come from Bonavista, you turned left instead of right, you would find yourself on Route 238-II which passes through Elliston Centre, Sandy Cove and the Neck and finishes in a circular road in Maberly i.e. 238-II is a dead-end.

References

238